Dawn or Red Morning (German: Morgenröte) is a 1929 German silent film directed by Wolfgang Neff and Burton George and starring Paul Henckels, Werner Fuetterer and Carl de Vogt.

The film's sets were designed by Fritz Willi Krohn.

Cast
 Paul Henckels as Michael Schwaiger  
 Werner Fuetterer as Stephan, sein Sohn  
 Carl de Vogt as Bernhard Eggebrecht  
 Helga Thomas as Margot, seine Frau  
 Elga Brink as Jutta, deren Schwester  
 Eugen Burg as Schücking, ein Finanzmann  
 Karl Platen as Berthold, ein Hauer  
 Evi Eva as Burgl, seine Tochter  
 Henry Bender as Der Wirt 'Zur guten Laune' 
 Max Maximilian as Obersteiger Bulaski

References

Bibliography
 Bock, Hans-Michael & Bergfelder, Tim. The Concise Cinegraph: Encyclopaedia of German Cinema. Berghahn Books, 2009.

External links

1929 films
Films of the Weimar Republic
German silent feature films
Films directed by Wolfgang Neff
German black-and-white films
Films about mining